Colonel Sir Claude Maxwell MacDonald,  (12 June 1852 – 10 September 1915) was a British soldier and diplomat, best known for his service in China and Japan.

Early life
MacDonald was born the son of Mary Ellen MacDonald (nee Dougan) and Major-General James (Hamish) Dawson MacDonald. He was educated at Uppingham School and Sandhurst. He was commissioned into the 74th Foot in 1872. He thought of himself as a 'soldier-outsider', as regards his subsequent career in the Foreign Office.

Africa
MacDonald’s early career was in Africa.  He served in the 1882 Anglo-Egyptian War, and served as military attaché to Sir Evelyn Baring from 1884 to 1887. From 1887 to 1889 he was Acting-Agent and Consul-general at Zanzibar, and then served some years as Commissioner and Consul-General at Brass in the West African Oil Rivers Protectorate, where in 1895 he was an observer of the rebellion of King Koko of Nembe. He retired from the British Army in 1896.

China and Korea
In 1896, MacDonald was appointed Her Majesty's Minister in China. He was simultaneously the British Minister to the Empire of Korea in 1896 through 1898.

In China, MacDonald obtained a lease at Weihaiwei, and obtained railway contracts for British syndicates.  He was instrumental in securing the Second Peking Convention, by which China leased to Britain the New Territories of Hong Kong. MacDonald secured a 99-year lease only because he thought 'it was good as forever'. This and the contrasting lease-in-perpetuity of Kowloon created some problems in the negotiations for the 1984 Sino-British Joint Declaration.

In 1899 MacDonald was the author of a diplomatic note which he proposed, on behalf of  British India, a boundary line between Jammu and Kashmir and the Chinese Turkestan, ceding roughly half of the Aksai Chin plateau, in return for China relinquishing its shadowy suzerainty over Hunza. The proposed boundary came to be known as the Macartney–MacDonald Line. The Qing China never made any response to the proposal. But the proposed boundary is still seen by scholars and commentators to have some relevance to the present day boundary disputes between China and India.

As a military man, MacDonald led the defence of the foreign legations in 1900 which were under siege during the Boxer Rebellion, and he worked well with the Anglophile Japanese Colonel Shiba Goro.

Japan
MacDonald was appointed Consul-General to the Empire of Japan in October 1900. He headed the British Legation in Tokyo during a period of harmonious relations between Britain and Japan (1900 to 1912), swapping appointments with Sir Ernest Satow who replaced him as Minister in Peking. On 30 January 1902, the first Anglo-Japanese Alliance was signed in London between the Foreign Secretary Lord Lansdowne and Hayashi Tadasu, the Japanese Minister.

MacDonald was still in Tokyo when the alliance was renewed in 1905 and 1911. He became Britain's first ambassador to Japan when the status of the legation was raised to that of embassy in 1905. Before 1905 the senior British diplomat in Japan had simultaneously held the joint positions of (a) Consul-General and (b) Envoy Extraordinary and Minister Plenipotentiary; the latter being a rank just below that of ambassador. MacDonald was made a Privy Councillor in 1906. He died in London of heart failure in 1915. He is buried with his wife in Brookwood Cemetery.

Dame Ethel, Lady MacDonald
In 1892, MacDonald wed Ethel (1857–1941), daughter of Major W. Cairns Armstrong; they remained married until his death in 1915. They had two daughters. Named to the RRC and a Member of the Executive Committee of the Overseas Nursing Association, Lady MacDonald was named Dame Commander of the Order of the British Empire in her own right in 1935.

Selected works
In a statistical overview derived from writings by and about MacDonald, OCLC/WorldCat encompasses roughly 10+ works in 20+ publications in 2 languages and 300+ library holdings.

 1900 — The Japanese detachment during the defence of the Peking legations, 1900
 1900 — Reports from Her Majesty's minister in China [Sir C. M. Macdonald] respecting events at Peking. Presented to parliament, Dec. 1900
 1898 — Despatch from Her Majesty's minister at Peking forwarding copies of the notes exchanged with the Chinese government respecting the non-alienation of the Yang-tsze region

Honours
 Knight Grand Cross of the Order of St Michael and St George (GCMG).
 Knight Grand Cross of the Royal Victorian Order (GCVO).
 Knight Commander of the Order of the Bath (KCB; Civil division).
 Knight Commander of the Order of the Bath (KCB; Military division) – awarded on 29 November 1900 "in recognition of services during the recent Operations in China".
 Egypt Medal (1882–1889) with clasps "Suakin 1884", "El-Teb" and "Tamaai".
 Order of Osmanieh, Fourth Class (Ottoman Empire).
 Khedive's Star (Khedivate of Egypt)

See also
 List of Privy Counsellors (1901–1910)
Anglo-Chinese relations
Anglo-Japanese relations

Notes

References
 Nish, Ian. (2004). British Envoys in Japan 1859–1972. Folkestone, Kent: Global Oriental. ;  OCLC 249167170

External links

 UK in Japan,  Chronology of Heads of Mission

1852 births
1915 deaths
Knights Grand Cross of the Order of St Michael and St George
Knights Commander of the Order of the Bath
Knights Grand Cross of the Royal Victorian Order
Ambassadors of the United Kingdom to Japan
Ambassadors of the United Kingdom to China
Anglo-Scots
People educated at Uppingham School
Graduates of the Royal Military College, Sandhurst
42nd Regiment of Foot officers
British Army personnel of the Anglo-Egyptian War
British Army personnel of the Mahdist War
British Army personnel of the Boxer Rebellion
74th Highlanders officers
Ambassadors of the United Kingdom to Korea
People from colonial Nigeria
British expatriates in Nigeria
Burials at Brookwood Cemetery
Members of the Privy Council of the United Kingdom
20th-century British diplomats
19th-century British diplomats